A vest is an upper-body garment, though the type of clothing depends on the dialect of English. In American English, a vest is what the British call a waistcoat, while in British and Indian English, it is what Americans call an undershirt or tank top.

Vest may also refer to:

Places
 Vest (development region), Romania
 Vest, Kentucky, an unincorporated community in the United States

People
 Alan Vest (born 1939), New Zealand football player and manager
 Allison Vest (born 1995), Canadian rock climber
 Charles M. Vest (1941–2013), American engineer, educator, and university president
 David Vest (born 1943), American musician
 Dick Vest (1897–1974), Australian rugby league footballer
 Dorothy Vest (1919–2013), American tennis player
 George Graham Vest (1830–1904), American politician
 George S. Vest (born 1918), American diplomat
 Jesse Vest (born 1977), American musician
 Lorenz Chrysanth von Vest (1776–1840), Austrian physician and botanist
 Will Vest (born 1995), American baseball player

Other uses
 VEST (Very efficient substitution transposition), a set of families of hardware-dedicated ciphers
 Vest (newspaper), a Macedonian newspaper
 Vest (schooner), a Danish auxiliary schooner in service 1958-68
 "The Vest", an episode of the TV series Homeland
 Vesting, a legal concept
 VAX Environment Software Translator, a binary translator for OpenVMS